Paul Edward Scruggs (born March 9, 1998) is an American basketball player. He previously played for the Xavier Musketeers of the Big East Conference.

High school career
Scruggs played for Southport High School in Indianapolis, Indiana in his first three years of high school. As a junior, he averaged 19 points, 7.8 rebounds and 4.4 assists per game, leading his team to its first regional title since 1990. Scruggs finished 55 points shy of the school's all-time scoring record. He competed for the Indy Hoosiers on the Amateur Athletic Union circuit. For his senior season, Scruggs transferred to Prolific Prep in Napa, California, joining his longtime friend Gary Trent Jr. In his fifth game of the season, he suffered a torn MCL in his left knee that required surgery, before returning for his team's final two games.

Recruiting
On October 14, 2016, Scruggs committed to playing college basketball for Xavier over offers from Indiana, Michigan State and UConn. He became the program's highest ranked recruit in the modern recruiting era. Scruggs explained his decision by saying, "It's the school that fits my style of play."

College career
Scruggs came off the bench for Xavier in his freshman season, averaging 4.9 points per game. He moved into a starting role in the following season. Scruggs averaged 12.3 points, 4.9 rebounds and 3.3 assists per game as a sophomore. He declared for the 2019 NBA draft before withdrawing his name and returning to college. On November 24, 2019, Scruggs scored 24 points in a 70–65 loss to Florida in the Charleston Classic title game, earning All-Tournament Team honors. Scruggs posted a junior season-high 30 points in an 80–78 loss to Wake Forest on December 14. He missed his team's final three games of the season with a hamstring injury. As a junior, he averaged 12.7 points, 4.5 rebounds and 2.9 assists per game. For his senior season, Scruggs was named co-captain of his team.

Career statistics

College

|-
| style="text-align:left;"| 2017–18
| style="text-align:left;"| Xavier
| 34 || 0 || 16.8 || .455 || .304 || .723 || 2.0 || 1.7 || .5 || .3 || 4.9
|-
| style="text-align:left;"| 2018–19
| style="text-align:left;"| Xavier
| 35 || 35 || 32.8 || .461 || .375 || .737 || 4.9 || 3.3 || 1.2 || .5 || 12.3
|-
| style="text-align:left;"| 2019–20
| style="text-align:left;"| Xavier
| 28 || 28 || 33.3 || .463 || .373 || .741 || 4.5 || 2.9 || 1.2 || .4 || 12.7
|-
| style="text-align:left;"| 2020–21
| style="text-align:left;"| Xavier
| 21 || 21 || 32.7 || .458 || .325 || .841 || 4.0 || 5.7 || 1.6 || .5 || 14.0
|- class="sortbottom"
| style="text-align:center;" colspan="2"| Career
| 118 || 84 || 28.3 || .460 || .355 || .762 || 3.8 || 3.2 || 1.1 || .4 || 10.6

Personal life
Scruggs is the son of Brenda and Dan Scruggs. His favorite NBA player is LeBron James.

References

External links
Xavier Musketeers bio

1998 births
Living people
American men's basketball players
Basketball players from Indianapolis
Shooting guards
Point guards
Xavier Musketeers men's basketball players